Billy-Jay Stedman (born 3 November 1999) is an English professional footballer who plays as an attacking midfielder for Portadown in the NIFL Premiership.

Career

Coventry City
Stedman started his career in the youth system at Coventry City before making his debut in an EFL Trophy 3–0 defeat against Arsenal U21 coming on in the 87th minute for Reise Allassani.

Víkingur
In February 2020, Stedman moved to Víkingur of the 1. Deild Karla, Iceland's second tier. His first goal in senior football came on 26 August 2020, scoring his side's third goal in a 3–0 win over Leiknir Reykjavík. During his season with the club, he made a total of 20 appearances in all competitions, scoring 1 goal.

Dorchester Town
Stedman signed for Southern Football League Premier Division South side Dorchester Town on 15 November 2021. He scored his first goals for the club on 4 December 2021, scoring a brace in a 3–1 win over Harrow Borough. He made a total of 11 appearances for the club, scoring 2 goals.

Portadown
On 31 January 2022, Stedman signed for NIFL Premiership club Portadown until the end of the season. He scored his first goal for the club on 16 April 2022, opening the scoring in an eventual 2–1 loss away to Ballymena United. On 3 May 2022, Stedman scored a vital winning goal in a 3–2 win away to Annagh United in the NIFL Premiership promotion/relegation play-off first leg.

Career statistics

References

External links

Profile at Football Web Pages

1999 births
Living people
English footballers
Coventry City F.C. players
Association football midfielders
Ungmennafélagið Víkingur players
Dorchester Town F.C. players
Portadown F.C. players
English Football League players
1. deild karla players
Southern Football League players
NIFL Premiership players
English expatriate footballers
Expatriate footballers in Iceland
English expatriate sportspeople in Iceland